The Monte Renoso massif is a chain of mountains in the south of the island of Corsica, France.
It takes its name from Monte Renoso, the highest peak.

Geography
The Monte Renoso massif is one of the four main blocks of mountains in Corsica.
These are (from north to south), the Monte Cinto massif, Monte Rotondo massif, Monte Renoso massif and Monte Incudine massif.
These massifs form the Corse cristalline, mainly composed of magmatic rocks such as granites, granulites,
porphyries and rhyolites.
The Monte Renoso massif is lower and more open than the northern ones.
It is bounded to the south by the Taravo river valley, to the west by the hillsides of Ajaccio country and to the east by the Fium'Orbo.

Peaks
The main peaks are,

See also
List of mountains in Corsica by height

Notes

Sources

Mountains of Haute-Corse
Mountains of Corse-du-Sud
Massifs of Corsica